5F-ADB-PINACA is a cannabinoid designer drug that is an ingredient in some synthetic cannabis products. It is a potent agonist of the CB1 receptor and CB2 receptor with EC50 values of 0.24 nM and 2.1 nM respectively.

Metabolism 
Twelve 5F-ADB-PINACA major metabolites were identified in several incubations with cryopreserved human hepatocytes. Major metabolic reactions included oxidative defluorination followed by carboxylation.

Legality

5F-ADB-PINACA is listed in the Fifth Schedule of the Misuse of Drugs Act (MDA) and therefore illegal in Singapore as of May 2015.

See also 

 5F-AB-PINACA
 5F-ADB
 5F-AMB
 5F-APINACA
 AB-FUBINACA
 AB-CHFUPYCA
 AB-CHMINACA
 AB-PINACA
 ADB-CHMINACA
 ADB-FUBINACA
 ADB-PINACA
 ADBICA
 APICA
 APINACA
 APP-FUBINACA
 MDMB-CHMICA
 MDMB-CHMINACA
 MDMB-FUBINACA
 PX-1
 PX-2
 PX-3

References 

Cannabinoids
Designer drugs

Indazolecarboxamides
Fluoroarenes